Éanna Murphy (born 1998) is an Irish hurler who plays as a goalkeeper for club side Tommy Larkin's and at inter-county level with the Galway senior hurling team.

Career statistics

Honours

Tommy Larkin
Galway Under-21 B Hurling Championship (1): 2019

Galway
Leinster Under-21 Hurling Championship (1): 2018

References

1998 births
Living people
Tommy Larkin's hurlers
Galway inter-county hurlers
Hurling goalkeepers